The geography of Omaha, Nebraska is characterized by its riverfront position alongside the Missouri River. The city's geography, with its proximity to the river was a factor in making Omaha the "Gateway of the West" from which thousands of settlers traveled into the American West during the 19th century. Environmental issues include more than one hundred years of industrial smelting along the riverfront along with the continuous impact of suburban sprawl on the city's west side. The city's climate is temperate.

Geography 
According to the United States Census Bureau, the city has a total area of 118.9 square miles (307.9 km²).

Situated in the Midwestern United States on the shore of the Missouri River in eastern Nebraska, the Port of Omaha helped the city grow in significance as a trading city. Much of Omaha is built in the Missouri River Valley. Other significant bodies of water in the Omaha-Council Bluffs metropolitan area include Lake Manawa, Papillion Creek, Carter Lake, Platte River and the Glenn Cunningham Lake.

The city's land has been altered considerably by human intervention, with substantial regrading throughout Downtown Omaha and scattered across the city. Minor land reclamation efforts, along with dams further upstream, have brought dozens of acres along the Missouri into usage. Many of the natural variations in topography have been evened out.

East Omaha sits on a flood plain west of the Missouri River. The area is the location of Carter Lake, an oxbow lake. The lake was once the site of East Omaha Island. In the crux of Carter Drive is an unnamed sulphur spring, and located south of there is Hardwood Creek. East Omaha was once the location of Florence Lake, which dried up at some point in the 1920s.

Cityscape
Similar to many other Western U.S. cities, Omaha was developed on a grid plan with the city center at the Missouri River and Dodge Street. This intersection was initially near the Lone Tree Ferry, Omaha's impetus for founding; today the city's downtown surrounds the area.

Neighborhoods

An expansive city covering a substantial area, Omaha has many different neighborhoods. Dozens of small neighborhoods spread across several distinct areas in the city's core areas of Downtown Omaha, Midtown Omaha, South Omaha and North Omaha. West Omaha, Northwest Omaha, Southwest Omaha and several Sarpy County cities and towns surround the city.

Climate

Though located at approximately the same latitude as Rome, Italy, Omaha, by virtue of its location near the center of North America far from large bodies of water or mountain ranges, has a humid continental climate (Köppen climate classification Dfa), with hot summers and cold winters.

Omaha has had its share of natural disasters by water and wind. The city's Carter Lake was formed by a massive flood which altered the course of the Missouri River. The Great Flood of 1881 filled Omaha and Council Bluffs with water for almost a month, causing two fatalities and millions of dollars in damage. As many as 1,000 people were displaced by a flood in 1943, which sent the Missouri River, Carter Lake, and the old Florence Lake into homes and businesses throughout East Omaha. The flood of April 13, 1952, led to 40,000 people being evacuated from East Omaha and Carter Lake. President Harry S. Truman personally visited the scene of the flooding in Omaha and officially declared it a disaster area.

Several neighborhoods in Midtown and North Omaha were severely damaged by the Easter Sunday tornado of 1913, which destroyed many businesses and neighborhoods. More than 200 people died during the event. The Omaha Tornado of 1975 cut through 10 miles of streets and residences, crossing the city's busiest intersection at 72nd and Dodge. Three people were killed and 133 were reported injured.

Environmental concerns
A 2004 report named northeast Omaha "one of the most dangerous toxic waste sites in the nation" after the United States Environmental Protection Agency (EPA) showed that more than 2,600 children in the area have lead poisoning. In early 2003, a large section of East Omaha was declared a Superfund site after thousands of yards tested positive for high levels of lead contamination resulting from a nearby lead smelter plant that operated for more than a century.

Natural disasters

In 1877 Omaha's Carter Lake was formed by a massive flood which altered the course of the Missouri River. The Great Flood of 1881 filled the Omaha and Council Bluffs with water for almost a month, causing two fatalities and millions of dollars in damage. As many as 1,000 people were displaced by a flood in 1943, which sent the Missouri River, Carter Lake, and the old Florence Lake into peoples' homes and businesses throughout East Omaha. The flood of April 13, 1952, led to 40,000 people being evacuated from East Omaha and Carter Lake. President Harry S. Truman personally visited the scene of the flooding in Omaha and officially declared it a disaster area.

Several neighborhoods in central Omaha and North Omaha were severely damaged by the Easter Sunday tornado of 1913, which destroyed many businesses and neighborhoods. More than 200 people died during the event. The Omaha Tornado of 1975 moved across  of streets and residences, crossing the city's busiest intersection at 72nd & Dodge. Three people were killed and 133 reported injured. Over 4,000 buildings were damaged and 287 were destroyed. In terms of damage, it was the costliest tornado in American history to that date, with insurance costs estimated at up to $1.1 billion (in 1975 dollars).

Notes

References